Yuliya Kutsko (born ) is a Kazakhstani female volleyball player. She was part of the Kazakhstan women's national volleyball team. She competed with the national team at the 2008 Summer Olympics in Beijing,  China. She played with Rahat in 2008.

Clubs
  Rahat (2008)

See also
 Kazakhstan at the 2008 Summer Olympics

References

1980 births
Living people
Kazakhstani women's volleyball players
People from Baranavichy
Volleyball players at the 2008 Summer Olympics
Olympic volleyball players of Kazakhstan
Asian Games medalists in volleyball
Volleyball players at the 2006 Asian Games
Volleyball players at the 2010 Asian Games
Medalists at the 2010 Asian Games
Asian Games bronze medalists for Kazakhstan
Kazakhstani people of Belarusian descent